My Friend may refer to:

Film 
 My Friend (film), a 1983 Bolivian film
 My Friend, a 1974 Indian film featuring Tun Tun

Music

Albums 
 My Friend (Neil Sedaka album) or the title song (see below), 1986
 My Friend (SG Wannabe album), 2008

Songs 
 "My Friend" (Groove Armada song), 2001
 "My Friend" (Jacques Houdek song), 2017
 "My Friend" (Oblivia song), 2000
 "My Friend" (Zard song), 1996
 "My Friend", by Bradley Joseph from The Journey Continues, 2003
 "My Friend", by Chungha, 2020
 "My Friend", by Frankie Laine, 1954
 "My Friend", by Jimi Hendrix from The Cry of Love, 1971
 "My Friend", by Neil Sedaka from In the Pocket, 1980
 "My Friend", by Royce da 5'9" from Rock City, 2002
 "My Friend", by Spirit from The Adventures of Kaptain Kopter & Commander Cassidy in Potato Land, 1981
 "My Friend", from the musical The Life, 1990
 "My Friend (So Long)", by DC Talk from Supernatural, 1998

See also 
 
 
 My Friends (disambiguation)
 Mi Amigo (disambiguation)